Merle is a genetic pattern that can be in a dog's coat. Merle comes in different colors and patterns and can affect all coat colors. The merle gene creates mottled patches of color in a solid or piebald coat, blue or odd-colored eyes, and can affect skin pigment as well. There are two general types of colored patches that will appear in a merle coat: liver (red merle) and black (blue merle). Some breeds that can be affected by this genetic trait are Carea Leonés, Australian Shepherds and Catahoula Leopard Dogs. This genetic trait should be taken seriously when breeding merles. Health issues are more typical and more severe when two merles are bred together, so it is recommended that a merle be bred with a non-merle dog of any other color.

Description 
Merle can affect all coat colors. The merle forms of brown and black are usually called "red" (though this is not correct; red and brown are genetically different) and "blue" as patches of blue are formed throughout the coat. Dogs who are recessive red can still be affected by merle, but the patches are either hardly seen or, if the dog is a clear recessive red, are not visible at all. Combinations such as brindle and sable merle exist, but are not typically accepted in breed standards.

In addition to altering base coat color, merle also modifies eye color and coloring on the nose and paw pads. The merle gene modifies the dark pigment in the eyes, occasionally changing dark eyes to blue, or part of the eye to be colored blue. Since merle causes random modifications, however, both dark-eyed, blue-eyed, and odd-colored eyes are possible. Pigmentation on paw pads and nose may be mottled by pink.

Breeds 
Merle is a distinguishing marking of several breeds, particularly the Australian Shepherd and Catahoula Leopard Dog, and appears in others, including the Koolie in Australia, the Shetland Sheepdog, various collie breeds, the Cardigan Welsh Corgi, the Pyrenean Shepherd and the Bergamasco Shepherd. In Dachshunds, the merle pattern is known as "dapple".  In Beaucerons the merle pattern is known as "harlequin". 
The merle gene also plays a part in producing harlequin Great Danes. 
Depending on the breed, registry, or country, the pattern may be register-able with a registry but not allowed in conformation, and the pattern may not be recognized by the breed standard, disqualifying it from showing. There may also be additional requirements for the pattern such as the dog being allowed to have the pattern but must have completely dark eyes with no blue in them.

Merle is sometimes introduced to other purebred dog breeds through crossbreeding, but these dogs are not purebred. In 2020 the UK Kennel Club (the oldest in the World) banned the registration of merle Poodles as it is not and never has been a colour pattern recognised in pure Poodles by the club.

Genetic basis 

Merle is actually a heterozygote of an incompletely dominant gene. If two such dogs are mated, on the average one quarter of the puppies will be "double merles", which is the common term for dogs homozygous for merle, and a high percentage of these double merle puppies could have eye defects and/or be deaf. Knowledgeable and responsible breeders who want to produce merle puppies mate a merle with a non-merle dog; roughly half the puppies will be merles, and none will have the vision or hearing defects associated with double merle dogs.

In January 2006 scientists at Texas A&M University announced the discovery of a mobile genetic unit called a retrotransposon, responsible for the merle mutation in dogs. Merle can be tested for and identified through DNA.

A phantom merle or cryptic merle is one with such small patches of merle—or none at all—that it appears to be a non-merle. This is commonly seen in dogs who are recessive red, clear recessive reds in particular, though patches can still be seen in certain red dogs. In America, a dog with the phantom merle coloring is described as being "cryptic for merle." A cryptic merle bred to a merle may produce merles, cryptic merles, or homozygous merles. Another mutation for cryptic merle has been identified by Dr. Helena Synková, and has been given the working name of "atypical merle". It is recommended that if a breeder is unsure if their dog is merle or not, that they be tested for the merle gene.

Merle modifiers 
Certain "modifying genes" work in tandem (co-dominate expressive) with the merle gene to create a completely different look to the pattern.

Often mistaken for a "double merle", a harlequin merle (or just harlequin), is a dog that carries both the merle pattern gene and the co-dominate modifying gene (carried on a different locus) for harlequin. This causes most or all of the "blue" to be replaced with white, leaving a dog that is mostly white with black patches. All dogs exhibiting the harlequin pattern are also carriers of the merle gene. Common in Great Danes, (and registered as Harlequin) it is less commonly seen in other breeds such as the Catahoula Leopard Dog, Shetland Sheepdog and Collie, where the dogs are registered simply as merle.

In 2018, a published paper identified multiple different types of merle that affect coat color differently.

Health issues 

Dogs with two copies of the merle gene (homozygous merle or "double merle") have an even higher chance of being deaf and with vision impairments. The UK Kennel Club has acknowledged the health risk associated with homozygous merle and stopped registering puppies produced from merle to merle matings in 2013. Merle to merle mating is currently only forbidden in three breeds. Recent research indicates that the majority of health issues occur in dogs carrying both piebald and merle genes.

The suppression of pigment cells (melanocytes) in the iris and in the stria vascularis of the cochlea (inner ear) leads to blue eyes and deafness. An auditory-pigmentation disorder in humans, Waardenberg syndrome, reflects some of the problems associated with heterozygous and homozygous merle dogs and genetic research in dogs has been undertaken with the goal of better understanding the genetic basis of this human condition.

Ocular defects 
Dogs who are homozygous for the merle pattern gene often have visual and auditory deficits. These dogs are sometimes referred to as 'double merle' and sometimes incorrectly referred to as 'lethal white'. Ocular defects include microphthalmia, conditions causing increased ocular pressure, and colobomas, among others. Double merle dogs may be deaf or blind or both, and can carry ocular defects in blue or colored eyes. Currently no studies have been done to prove whether or not the merle gene affects the eyes, causing blindness.

Auditory defects 
In one study of 38 dachshunds by a German researcher, partial hearing loss was found in 54.6% of double merles and 36.8% of single merles. 1 out of the 11 (9.1%) double merles was fully deaf while none of the single merles were. Another study done by Texas A&M University found that of 22 double merles, 8 were completely deaf and two were deaf in one ear. Of 48 single merles, only one was deaf in one ear, and none were completely deaf. In another study of 70 dogs, 15 of them Catahoula Curs, 4 of the Catahoulas were deaf, while 86% of the double merles of other breeds were deaf.

Deaf, blind, and deaf and blind dogs can have good lives when properly cared for. There are a variety of internet groups dedicated to supporting carers of such dogs. Deaf dogs can compete successfully in agility.

See also 
 List of dog coat patterns

References

External links 

 Merle dog coat color genetics
 Deafness in Dogs and Cats
 White Aussies Project
 Genetics of merle dogs
 : Basic, simple-language explanation of Australian Shepherd merle colorings
 Homozygous "Lethal White" Merles
 Border Wars - Double Merle Articles
 Banning of Merle 'pattern' Chihuahua in Canada
 Catahoula Coat Color Genetics - Introduction and History of Merle

Dog anatomy
Animal hair
Animal coat colors

https://www.americanspanielclub.org/about-the-breed/merle-color-in-cocker-spaniels/